Sagarakanyaka is a sculpture of a mermaid situated at the Shankumugham Beach,  Kerala. Sculpted by Kanayi Kunhiraman, it is adjudged by the Guinness Book of World Records as the largest merperson sculpture in the world. It has a length of 87 ft and a height of 25 ft. Kunhiraman took two years to complete the sculpture which was finally completed in 1992.

Overview
Kunhiraman completed the sculpture without taking any renumeration. During the construction, the District Collector ordered to stop the construction of the sculpture by saying it was obscene. But K. Karunakaran, who was the Chief Minister at that time intervened and suggested the completion of the sculpture upon the request of Kunhiraman. In October 2022, it was adjudged  as the largest merperson sculpture in the world by the Guinness Book of World Records.

References

Sculptures in India